The AMO-F-15 was a light truck based on the Italian Fiat 15Ter at the AMO-plant in Moscow in the Soviet Union from the mid-1920s. It was the first Soviet truck to be produced in the first series, with a total of more than 6,000 units made between 1924 and 1931. Different models were built based on the vehicle: flatbed trucks, omnibuses, fire engines, ambulances and armored versions for the military.

History
Produced under licence, the production of the truck was originally meant to began shortly after the October Revolution in 1917. Because of the events of the first world war, AMO initially had to limit itself to assembling components purchased from Fiat. Independent series production of the AMO-F-15, which was a replica of the Fiat F-15, did not begin until 1924.

Various changes were made to the vehicle over the course of the production history. Between 1925 and 1926 the shape of the radiator changed, since 1927 there was a new shape of the fenders and a fixed canopy. In 1928, an electrical lighting system and a horn were installed for the first time; In 1930 the steering wheel was moved to the left.

6,285 trucks built up to 1931 were produced, 3,227 of them in the penultimate year of production. From 1930 a new truck type was produced with the AMO-2 and in October 1931 with the appearance of the AMO-3 the production of the AMO-F-15 was stopped.

Models and variants
A total of six different variants of the vehicle were manufactured:

 The AMO-F-15 was the basic version and was delivered as a flatbed truck.
 With a bus body, the vehicle was produced from 1926 and was equipped with seats for 14 passengers.
 A fire engine from 1927.
 An armored version was produced for the military from 1928 under the name BA-27. 215 copies were built.
 Also for the military in 1927, nine AMO-F-15s with a top and a car body were manufactured. They served as staff vehicles for high-ranking Red Army officers.
 An ambulance version of the vehicle had been available since 1925.

Specifications
The following technical data apply to the version with a flatbed.

 displacement: 4396 cm³
 power: 35 HP
 bore / stroke: 100 mm / 140 mm
 length over all: 5050 mm
 width: 1760 mm
 height: 2250 mm
 wheelbase: 3070 mm
 ground clearance: 225 mm
 transmission: 4-speed gearshift
 vehicle lighting: gas-fired, electric from 1928
 empty weight: 2050 kg
 payload: 1500 kg
 total weight: 3550 kg
 tire dimension: 885 × 185 mm
 top speed: 50 km/h
 fuel consumption: 28 L/100 km
 tank capacity: 70 L
 maximum negotiable slope: 12°
 maximum slope that can be driven on: 10°
 wading depth: 600 mm
 layout: 4×2

References 
 Shugurov, Lev Mikhaĭlovich: Avtomobili Rossii i SSSR (Klub fanatov tekhniki) (Russian Edition) 

ZiL vehicles
Trucks